Brazzaville is the capital of the Republic of the Congo. It may also refer to:

 Brazzaville (US band)
 Brazzaville (Swedish band)
 Brazzaville Conference of 1944
 CARA Brazzaville, a Congolese football club based in Brazzaville
 Brazzaville Protocol